"Love Me Two Times" is a song by the American rock band the Doors. First appearing on their second studio album Strange Days, it was later edited to a 2:37 length and released as the second single (after "People Are Strange") from that album. The single reached number 25 on the charts in the United States.

"Love Me Two Times" was considered to be somewhat risqué for radio airplay, being banned in New Haven for being "too controversial," much to the dismay of the band.

Composition
As with the other songs on Strange Days, the album liner notes list the songwriters as the Doors as does the "Love Me Two Times" single; the performance rights organization ASCAP shows the writers as the individual Doors members.

"Love Me Two Times" incorporates elements from baroque music and has been classified as a pop and blues song. Band guitarist Robby Krieger stated to Guitar Worlds Alan Paul that the song's musical idea came from a lick by one of Danny Kalb's compositions. Doors keyboardist Ray Manzarek played the final version of this song on a harpsichord, not a clavichord that has been often confused. Manzarek described the instrument as "a most elegant instrument that one does not normally associate with rock and roll."

Lyrics
In his autobiography, Manzarek described the song as "Robby [Krieger]'s great blues/rock classic about lust and loss, or multiple orgasms, I'm not sure which". According to author Rich Weidman the song is about a sailor or soldier spending one last day with his girlfriend before shipping out to war.

Critical reception
In an AllMusic album review of Strange Days, critic Richie Unterberger described "Love Me Two Times" as "jerkily rhythmic", while Rolling Stone called the song a "heavy, evocative and climatic piece". Sal  Cinquemani of Slant Magazine also proclaimed that the song is the album's "most accessible, straightforward rock tune", and praised its "virtuosic harpsichord solo and one of the band's grooviest guitar riffs."  Billboard described the single as a "strong folk rocker that can't miss soaring to the top of the Hot 100."  Cash Box said that the song was "solid Chicago blues with a punch all its own" and has a "rock pace that builds through the vocal thrusts of lead Jim Morrison, and excellent instrumental sections."

Aerosmith version
"Love Me Two Times" was recorded by Aerosmith for the soundtrack of the 1990 film Air America (whose producers, Carolco Pictures, would also produce a biopic about the Doors). The band also performed it at its 1990 MTV Unplugged performance, where lead singer Steven Tyler dedicated the song to Jim Morrison, who performed with the Doors at the same venue of the Unplugged performance, the Ed Sullivan Theater, several years prior. The 1990 cover reached number 27 on the U.S. Mainstream Rock Tracks chart. In 2001, the song was included on their greatest hits album, Young Lust: The Aerosmith Anthology. In addition, a remixed version was included on the Doors tribute album Stoned Immaculate, with added slide guitar by Robby Krieger and keyboards by Ray Manzarek.

References

1967 singles
The Doors songs
Songs written by John Densmore
Songs written by Robby Krieger
Songs written by Ray Manzarek
Songs written by Jim Morrison
Aerosmith songs
Song recordings produced by Paul A. Rothchild
1967 songs
Elektra Records singles
Obscenity controversies in music